Tulip Time: The Rise and Fall of the Trio Lescano (2008) is a documentary film about the Italian close harmony group Trio Lescano, their rise, downfall, and eventual arrest by Italian fascists. After a farewell radio broadcast on September 1, 1945, the trio moved to South America to resume their career.

The film had its U.S. premiere at the San Francisco Jewish Film Festival on July 30, 2008. The film was produced by the Netherlands film production company Memphis Film.

External links

Review of the film at SFJFF website
Memphis Film website

2008 films
Jews and Judaism in Italy
Documentary films about World War II
Dutch documentary films
2008 documentary films